Conybeare or Coneybeare is a surname. Notable people with the surname include:

Catherine Conybeare (born 1966), American philologist
Charles Conybeare (disambiguation), multiple people
Chris Conybeare, Australian public servant
Florence Annie Conybeare (1872–1916), British suffragist
Frederick Cornwallis Conybeare (1856–1924) British orientalist
Henry Conybeare (1823–1892), British civil engineer and architect
John Conybeare (1692–1755), British prelate and theologian
John Josias Conybeare (1779–1824), British scholar
John Josias Conybeare (1888–1967), English doctor, author of Conybeare's Textbook of Medicine
L. Ted Coneybeare (1925–2012), Canadian television producer
Rod Coneybeare (1930–2019), Canadian puppeteer, voice actor, and author
William Conybeare (disambiguation), multiple people